All the Best from Prism is the first compilation album by Canadian rock band Prism, released in December 1980. The album features the band's greatest hits as well as a new song, "Cover Girl", which failed to chart in both Canada and the U.S. In 1981, All the Best from Prism was certified platinum in Canada (in excess of 100,000 copies sold).

Track listing
 "Spaceship Superstar" (Jim Vallance) – 4:05
 "Take Me to the Kaptin" (Vallance) – 3:55
 "It's Over" (Vallance) – 4:01
 "Flyin'" (Al Harlow) – 4:30
 "Take Me Away" (Harlow) – 3:12
 "See Forever Eyes" (John Hall, Lindsay Mitchell) – 5:05
 "Cover Girl" (Mitchell, Bryan Adams) – 2:52
 "Night to Remember" (Mitchell) – 5:46
 "Virginia" (Bruce Miller) – 3:53
 "Young & Restless" (Mitchell, Harlow) – 3:24
 "Armageddon" (Mitchell) – 7:39

Personnel
Prism
 Ron Tabak – lead vocals
 Lindsay Mitchell – lead guitar
 Allen Harlow – bass guitar, guitar
 Rocket Norton – drums
 John Hall – keyboards

Production
 David Elliot – art direction
 Shun Sasabuchi – photography, art direction
 Bruce Allen – management
 John Carter – producer on "Cover Girl"
 Bruce Fairbairn – producer on all tracks except "Cover Girl"

Certifications

References

1980 compilation albums
Prism (band) albums